Nenad Stamenković (Serbian Cyrillic: Ненад Стаменковић; born 7 July 1977) is a Serbian football defender. He last played for FK Radnički Niš in the Serbian SuperLiga. He retired in summer 2012, and from 2012 to 2015 he was assistant manager to Aleksandar Ilić at FK Radnički Niš.

References

Honours
 Serbian First League
 Winner (1): 2012

Sportspeople from Niš
Serbian footballers
FK Radnički Niš players
FK Mladost Apatin players
OFK Niš players
FK Sinđelić Niš players
1977 births
Living people
Association football defenders